Vibration refers to mechanical oscillations about an equilibrium point.

Vibrations or The Vibrations may also refer to:

Music 

 The Vibrations, an African-American soul vocal group from Los Angeles, California, United States
 Vibrations (Eurobeat label), a label of Eurobeat founded in 1995 by Luigi Stanga and Gino Caria
 Vibrations (song), a 2012 song by Jade Louise
 "Vibrations", a 2019 song by Ashley Tisdale from Symptoms
 Vibrations (Milt Jackson album), a 1964 album by vibraphonist Milt Jackson
 Vibrations (Albert Ayler album), an alternative release of saxophonist Albert Ayler's 1965 album Ghosts
 Vibrations (The Three Sounds album), a 1966 album by the jazz group The Three Sounds
 Vibrations (Roy Ayers album), a 1976 album Roy Ayers album

Other 

 Vibrations (film), a 1996 film directed and written by Michael Paseornek
 Vibrations (spiritual energy), the energy that practitioners of some esoteric, meditation and martial arts say they can feel
 Vibration (radio station), a radio station in France

See also 

 Vibrate (disambiguation)
 Vibrator (disambiguation)